David Kenyon is a British archaeologist and military historian.  He was one of the military advisors on the film War Horse.  He is known for his work on presenting and interpreting World War I history at public events and in the media. Since 2015, he is the Research Historian at Bletchley Park. He is also an Associate Lecturer in History at Brunel University and an Honorary Research Fellow in the School of History at the University of Kent.

Works

References

British archaeologists
British military historians
Year of birth missing (living people)
Living people
Place of birth missing (living people)